
Kephart may refer to:

People
 Beth Kephart, American author of non-fiction, poetry and young adult fiction
 Calvin Ira Kephart (1883–1969), American law professor
 Elza Kephart (born 1976), Canadian director, producer, and writer
 Horace Kephart (1862–1931), American travel writer and librarian
 Jeffrey Owen Kephart, American engineer
 William P. Kephart (1915–1942), American naval officer

Places
 Mount Kephart, in the central Great Smoky Mountains, Southeastern United States

Other uses
 USS Kephart (DE-207), a Buckley-class destroyer escort

See also
 Gephardt, surname